The New Calendarists are Eastern Orthodox churches that adopted the Revised Julian calendar.

Background 
In the history of Christianity, divisions on which calendar to use were initiated after 1582, when the Roman Catholic Church transitioned from the ancient Julian calendar to the new Gregorian calendar. During the Early Modern period, this change has sparked debates throughout Western Christianity, particularly in Protestant countries, where proponents of the new calendar were often seen as papists.

Eventually, by the 18th century, the Gregorian Calendar was officially adopted even in Protestant countries as the civil calendar, but still faced some opposition from smaller groups. In the Kingdom of Great Britain, the Gregorian calendar was officially introduced in 1752.

Around the same time, debates between those wanting to adopt the Gregorian Calendar and traditionalists wanting to keep the Julian calendar were also going on within several Eastern Catholic Churches. Those debates were focused mainly on ritual questions, and ended in various compromises. The need for preservation of ritual differences, including various questions related to liturgical calendar, was consequently acknowledged by Rome.

New Calendarists

In 1923, the Revised Julian calendar was devised. Since then, several Eastern Orthodox Churches have introduced partial changes  into their liturgical calendars. Those changes were based on the application of the Revised Julian calendar for the liturgical celebration of immovable feasts (including Christmas), thus reducing the use of the old Julian calendar to liturgical celebration of moveable feasts (feasts of the Easter cycle).

Thus, the Revised calendar use was introduced. It was consequently adopted in March 1924 by:
 the Ecumenical Patriarchate,
 the Church of Greece,
 the Church of Cyprus;
 the Romanian Orthodox Church (later in 1924),
 the Patriarchate of Alexandria (in 1928),
 the Patriarchate of Antioch (in 1928), and
 the Bulgarian Orthodox Church (in 1968) adopted the Revised calendar.
The Orthodox Church in America (except for Alaska) and the Albanian Orthodox Church also use the revised calendar.

It was not adopted by the E. Orthodox Churches of:
  Jerusalem,
 Georgia,
 Russia,
 Sinai, and
 the monasteries on the Mount Athos.
The Polish Orthodox Church has wavered between the two calendars; today it officially follows the old calendar.

In Eastern Orthodoxy, issues related to calendar reform did not produce break of communion or schisms between the mainstream churches, but they did cause disputes and internal schisms within some churches. The result of those conflicts was the emergence of the Old Calendarist movement, and consequent creation of separate churches, thus breaking the communion with those mother churches that accepted the calendar reform.

See also
 Adoption of the Gregorian calendar
 French revolutionary calendar
 Revised Julian calendar
 Old Calendarists

References

Sources

 
 
 
 

Calendars
History of Eastern Christianity
History of Eastern Orthodoxy
Liturgical calendars
Old Calendarism
Julian calendar